The Rio de Janeiro state football team represents Rio de Janeiro in association football.

History
The team was created in 1901 in response to the creation of a team for São Paulo, since at the beginning of the 20th century these were the two centers where the practice of football began in Brazil.

Because they preceded the Brazil national squad which played its first match in 1914, sometimes Rio de Janeiro represented the country (as did the São Paulo state team), against foreign squads that toured South America, or against Argentina, who in that period were more developed in the practice of football.

It is the most successful team in the Campeonato Brasileiro de Seleções Estaduais (Brazilian State Selection Championship), with 15 titles conquered.

Periods

Rio de Janeiro was the capital of Brazil until 1960, year of construction of Brasília, then the Seleção Carioca represented the Federal District (later, the Guanabara State) until in 1975, there was the unification of the city of Rio de Janeiro with the state of Rio de Janeiro. There was also the Rio de Janeiro state football team (countryside), called Seleção Fluminense (1922–1978), who faced the Seleção Carioca several times in previous decades.

Players

Following is the information about the players who appeared for the Rio de Janeiro state team:

Notable players

 
 Ademir
 Bismarck
 Carvalho Leite
 Castilho
 Chico
  Dejan Petkovic
 Didi
 Domingos da Guia
  Edgardo Andrada
 Edmundo
 Garrincha
 Gérson
  Harry Welfare
 Leônidas
 Nilo
 Patesko
 Preguinho
 Renato Gaúcho
 Roberto Dinamite
 Romário
 Sylvio Pirillo
 Túlio Maravilha
 Vavá
 Zagallo
 Zezé
 Zico
 Zizinho

Top goalscorers

Managers

These are all the managers who as headed Rio de Janeiro state team:

 
 Luiz Vinhaes (1931–1933)
 Carlos Carlomagno (1934–1937)
 Hílton Santos (1938)
 Jayme Barcelos (1938–1939)
 Costa Velho (1939)
 Osvaldo Melo (1940–1941)
 Flávio Costa (1941–1945)
 Luiz Vinhaes (1946)
 Flávio Costa (1947–1950)
 Zezé Moreira (1952)
 Martim Francisco (1955)
 Newton Anet (1956)
 Flávio Costa (1956)
 Sylvio Pirillo (1957)
 Gentil Cardoso (1957)
 Tim (1959–1960)
 Jorge Vieira (1961)
 Flávio Costa (1962–1963)
 Daniel Pinto (1964)
 Mário Zagallo (1967)
 Paulinho (1968)
 Mário Zagallo (1969)
 Otto Glória (1970)
 Paraguaio (1971)
 Mário Travaglini (1972–1975)
 Orlando Fantoni (1977)
 Edu Coimbra (1981)
 Zé Mario (1982)
 Sebastião Lazaroni (1987)
 José Maria Pena (1988)
 Antônio Clemente (1990)
 Sérgio Cosme (1990)
 Ricardo Barreto (1996)
 Alcir Portela (1996)
 Renato Gaúcho (2004)
 Alfredo Sampaio (2008)
 Zico (2010)

Honours

Campeonato Brasileiro de Seleções Estaduais:
Winners (15): 1924, 1925, 1927, 1928, 1931, 1935 (CBD), 1935 (FBF), 1938, 1939, 1940, 1943, 1944, 1946, 1950, 1987
Taça Rio-São Paulo de Seleções: (vs. São Paulo)
Winners: 1915
Taça Delfim Moreira: (vs. Minas Gerais)
Winners (2): 1919, 1920
Taça São Januário: (vs. Huracán)
Winners: 1930
Taça Emílio Garrastazu Médici: (vs. Minas Gerais)
Winners: 1971
Taça Heleno Nunes: (vs. São Paulo)
Winners: 1975

Fixtures and results

21st century

The Rio de Janeiro team played only three matches in the XXI century:

Last squad 

The following players were called up for the Copa Inovação against São Paulo, on 9 December 2010.

Head-to-head record

Below is a result summary of all matches Rio de Janeiro have played against another Brazilian state teams, FIFA national teams and clubs.

State teams (non-FIFA)

National teams (FIFA)

References